Dumbalo is a village and deh in Matli taluka of Badin District, Sindh. As of 2017, it has a population of 8,735, in 1,687 households. It is part of the tapedar circle of Gujo-I. Dumbalo is also the seat of a Union Council, which has a total population of 52,212.

References

Populated places in Badin District